Karen C. Vick (née Dunlap) is a character on the American comedy detective drama Psych played by Kirsten Nelson.

Fictional biography
According to Head Detective Carlton Lassiter's weblog, Vick replaced Police Chief John Fenich upon his retirement about a month prior to Shawn's arrival at the SBPD in the pilot episode. However, in "Poker? I Barely Know Her", she references an event known as "The Secret Santa Debacle of 2005", suggesting that she has been involved in the Santa Barbara Police Department in some capacity at least since December of that year. Vick's relationship with Lassiter seems strained by the fact that she is "an outsider" who was chosen by "the powers that be in City Hall" to take the position over "someone from within our own ranks." Vick's decision to allow a self-proclaimed psychic so far into official police investigations has done little to assuage Lassiter's misgivings. Eventually, Lassiter's attitude towards both Shawn and Vick soothed.

On her way to non-lethal weapons training with Lassiter, Vick's water broke and Lassiter rushed her to a hospital where she gave birth to a daughter in Shawn vs. the Red Phantom (1.08).

Because Nelson was pregnant during the filming of the pilot episode and gave birth shortly thereafter, for continuity she had to wear a fake pregnancy prosthesis for several of the following episodes.

For Seasons 1 and 2, her position as Police Chief was described as 'interim.' At the end of Season 2, Vick announced that she would step down because her position as Chief was not solidified by the mayor, but she received a call from the mayor soon after, effectively giving her the position.

She has an older sister (played by Jane Lynch) in the Coast Guard with whom she has a strained relationship (though they made up since then). This sister once ordered Carlton Lassiter out on a date with her. Shawn Spencer gives Vick the nickname of "Chiefie."

At the climax of the Season 7 finale, she is suspended from her position as Police Chief for six months, with Harris Trout becoming interim chief. The suspended Chief Vick leaves the group after their goodbyes, exits the station, and goes to pick up her daughter from school for the first time in six months. Harris Trout, portrayed by Anthony Michael Hall, begins making drastic changes, such as Lassiter being demoted from head detective, officer McNab being fired, and Shawn and Gus are told their services will no longer be required by the department.

Vick returns in the Season 8 episode "1967: A Psych Odyssey" where she tells everyone that she has accepted a job as police chief in San Francisco. She asks Juliet to become her head detective, which she accepts. Vick appears in the series finale, reuniting with Shawn and Gus, who have come to San Francisco.

Characterization
She was impressed by Shawn Spencer's display of psychic-like insight into her police officer's lives after she tried to arrest him for being an accomplice in a series of crimes which were solved with Shawn's tips. She is suspicious of his psychic abilities, but is not above using any tool at her disposal to solve tough cases. In the episode "There Might Be Blood", Shawn starts to have a "vision" about her relationship with her sister, but she quickly tells him not to do it. She did talk to him about the situation, though.

References

Fictional Santa Barbara Police Department detectives
Psych characters
Television characters introduced in 2006